The Royal Victoria Regiment is an Infantry Regiment of the Australian Army, consisting of two battalions, the 5th/6th Battalion and the 8th/7th Battalion.

History
The Regiment was formed in 1960 as a result of the amalgamation of all the Citizen Military Forces infantry battalions in Victoria. The regiment was formed in 1960 as the Victoria Regiment as part of the reorganisation of the Australian Army by the amalgamation of the six existing infantry regiments in Victoria:
Victorian Scottish Regiment
Royal Melbourne Regiment
Melbourne Rifles
North Western Victorian Regiment
The Northern Victorian Regiment
Hume Regiment

The regiment, renamed as the Royal Victoria Regiment in 1960, was initially formed of two battalions. In 1965. this was increased to four battalions, plus a single independent rifle company. A further reorganisation in the 1970s saw these battalions further amalgamated into the existing regimental structure. Currently the 5th/6th Battalion recruits mainly from the areas in and around the city of Melbourne, while the 8th/7th Battalion is responsible for the wider rural areas in Victoria.

Pipes and Drums

Formed in 1899 as part of the Victorian Scottish Regiment, the 5/6RVR Pipes and Drums is now the band for all battalions of the Royal Victoria Regiment. Some members of 5/6 RVR Pipes and Drums are serving Army Reservists from 5th/6th Battalion, Royal Victoria Regiment, other members are derived from other Army Reserve units / parts of the Australian Defence Force, and selected guest players.

Alliances
5th/6th Battalion, The Royal Victoria Regiment
 - The Royal Regiment of Fusiliers - via the 6th Battalion (The Royal Melbourne Regiment)
 - The Gordon Highlanders - via the 5th Battalion (The Victorian Scottish Regiment)
 - The Lake Superior Scottish Regiment - via the 58th/32nd Battalion
 - The Toronto Scottish Regiment - via Gordon Alliance
 - 48th Highlanders of Canada - via Gordon Alliance
 - Cape Town Highlanders Regiment - via Gordon Alliance
8th/7th Battalion, The Royal Victoria Regiment
 - The Mercian Regiment
 - The Royal Regiment of Canada

See also
 5/6RVR Pipes and Drums
 Australian Army
 Australian Army Reserve
 List of Australian Army Regiments

External links
 Official website of 4 Brigade
 5/6RVR Pipes and Drums

 
V
Military units and formations established in 1960
Australian army units with royal patronage
1960 establishments in Australia